Dorypteryx domestica is a species of cave barklouse in the family Psyllipsocidae. It is found in Africa, Europe and Northern Asia (excluding China), and North America.

References

Further reading

 

Trogiomorpha